Bathypolypus is a genus of octopuses in the monotypic family Bathypolypodidae. It has five described species.

Species
Species in the genus Bathypolypus include:
 Bathypolypus arcticus (Prosch, 1847)
 Bathypolypus arcticus arcticus – spoonarm octopus (Prosch, 1847) 
 Bathypolypus arcticus proschi Muus, 1962 
 Bathypolypus rubrostictus Kaneko & Kubodera, 2008
 Bathypolypus sponsalis – globose octopus (Fischer & Fischer, 1892)
 Bathypolypus valdiviae – boxer octopus (Thiele in Chun, 1915)

Synonyms:
 Bathypolypus salebrosus (Sasaki, 1920) is a synonym for Sasakiopus salebrosus (Sasaki, 1920)
 Bathypolypus faeroensis  (Frederick Stratten Russel|Russell) is a synonym for Bathypolypus arcticus (Prosch, 1847) (Fabricius, 1777)

References

External links

 
 Wood, J.B. 2000.   Ph.D. Thesis, Dalhousie University, Halifax, Nova Scotia.

Cephalopod genera
Taxa named by Georg Grimpe
Octopuses